Adolf Scherer (born 5 May 1938) is a Slovak footballer who played as a striker. He is of Carpathian German descent.  He played 36 games and scored 22 goals for the Czechoslovakia national team. Scherer represented Czechoslovakia at the 1960 European Nations' Cup and 1958 FIFA World Cup, where he did not play any match. 

In the 1962 FIFA World Cup, he again played for the Czechoslovak national team - where he proved himself to be a valuable player. They made it to the final match against Brazil, and Scherer assisted Josef Masopust in Czechoslovakia’s first and only goal of the game. Brazil ultimately won the match, subsequently scoring three more. 

Throughout the tournament, Scherer scored a total of three goals - including a winning goal in the quarterfinal against Hungary and a late goal against Yugoslavia in the semifinal.

In 1973, Scherer emigrated from Czechoslovakia to France, where he played for French football club Olympique Avignonais until his retirement in 1975. 

He now lives in the southern France, near Nîmes with his wife. he had two children, a daughter and a son. His son, Rudolf (also known as 'Tcheck'), is, like his father, well involved in football. He played for various clubs including Nîmes Olympique. Rudolf now trains Barbentane football club, a city near Avignon.

References

1938 births
Living people
Slovak people of German descent
Slovak footballers
Czechoslovak footballers
Association football forwards
Czechoslovakia international footballers
1958 FIFA World Cup players
1962 FIFA World Cup players
FK Inter Bratislava players
Nîmes Olympique players
AC Avignonnais players
Ligue 1 players
Czechoslovak expatriate footballers
Czechoslovak expatriate sportspeople in France
Expatriate footballers in France
Czechoslovak emigrants to France
Czechoslovak defectors
Sportspeople from Martin, Slovakia